Massam is a surname. People with this name include:
Chris Massam, New Zealand founder of Mako Networks
D. Massam, New Zealand Antarctic explorer, namesake of Mount Massam and the Massam Glacier
Diane Massam, Canadian linguist
Hélène Massam, Canadian statistician
Rob Massam (born 1987), Welsh international rugby league footballer

See also
Massam's South African dessert candy
Massam, principal town of the Kpaka Chiefdom in Sierra Leone